R703 road may refer to:
 R703 road (Ireland)
 R703 (South Africa)